"Broken Leg" is a song written and recorded by Australian indie rock band Bluejuice. The song was released in July 2009 as the lead single from the band's second studio album, Head of the Hawk. The song peaked at number 27 on the ARIA Charts and was certified gold in 2010.

AT the ARIA Music Awards of 2009, the song was nominated for two awards; Breakthrough Artist and Best Video.

The song polled at number 5 on the 2009 Triple J Hottest 100.

Charts

Weekly charts

Year-end charts

Certification

Release history

References

2009 singles
2009 songs
Dew Process singles